For the First Time is a 1974 studio album by Count Basie, with bassist Ray Brown and drummer Louie Bellson. Basie, Brown and Bellson followed For the First Time with For the Second Time (1975).

Track listing
"Baby Lawrence" (Count Basie) – 3:10
"Pres" (Basie) – 3:28
"I'll Always Be in Love With You" (Bud Green, Fred Ruby, Sam H. Stept) – 5:54
"Blues in the Church" (Basie) – 5:00
"Oh, Lady Be Good [Concept 1]" (George Gershwin, Ira Gershwin) – 5:32
"Oh, Lady Be Good [Concept 2]" (G. Gershwin, I. Gershwin) – 3:57
"Blues in the Alley" (Basie) – 6:44
"As Long as I Live" (Harold Arlen, Ted Koehler) – 3:33
"Song of the Islands" (Charles E. King) – 4:51
"Royal Gardens Blues" (Clarence Williams, Spencer Williams) – 4:28
"(Un) Easy Does It" (Sy Oliver, Trummy Young) – 4:08
"O.P." (Basie) – 4:48

Personnel
 Count Basie - piano
 Ray Brown - double bass
 Louie Bellson - drums

References

1974 albums
Count Basie albums
Pablo Records albums
Albums produced by Norman Granz